Erastus "Deaf" Smith (April 19, 1787 – November 30, 1837), who earned his nickname due to hearing loss in childhood, was an American frontiersman noted for his part in the Texas Revolution and the Army of the Republic of Texas. He fought in the Grass Fight and the Battle of San Jacinto. After the war, Deaf Smith led a company of Texas Rangers. 

Smith died in Richmond, Texas, at age of 50, at the home of Randall Jones. The Episcopal churchyard has a modest marker, "Deaf Smith, the Texas Spy, Died Nov. 30, 1837", but his exact burial site is unknown.

Posthumous legacy
 

Deaf Smith County, Texas, is named in his honor. Likewise, a brand of peanut butter known as Deaf Smith was manufactured by the Arrowhead Mills company, which was founded in 1960 by Frank Ford, then from Hereford, the seat of Deaf Smith County.

Many school districts in Texas name schools after heroes of the Texas Revolution. Several schools across the state are named for Deaf Smith, including Lamar CISD's Deaf Smith Elementary in Richmond, Texas.

In popular culture
 1915, Martyrs of the Alamo, Smith was played by Sam De Grasse (as "Silent Smith")
 1939, Man of Conquest, Smith was played by Max Terhune.
 1956, The First Texan, Smith was played by Chubby Johnson.
 1958, in "Deaf Smith" episode of The Adventures of Jim Bowie, Deaf Smith was played by Vic Perrin.
 1972, Los Amigos (Smith and Johnny Ears) is based on Smith; Anthony Quinn played the Deaf Smith character.
 1986, TV movie Houston: The Legend of Texas, Smith was played by Ivy Pryce.
 1998, TNT's TV Movie Two for Texas, Smith was played by Richard Andrew Jones.
 2004, Alamo, Smith was played by Michael Crabtree.
 2015, Texas Rising, Smith was played by Jeffrey Dean Morgan.

References

References
 
 "Battle of San Jacinto" A Texas Historical Commission historical marker.
 ” Daughters of the Republic of Texas, Muster Rolls of the Texas Revolution (Austin, 1986).
 ” Joseph Milton Nance, Attack and Counterattack: The Texas-Mexican Frontier, 1842 (University of Texas Press, 1964).
 ” The Writings of Sam Houston, 1813-1863 (University of Texas Press, 1938)
 Erastus "Deaf" Smith historical marker, Lake Casa Blanca International State Park, Laredo, Texas, dedicated 1936

External links

  Young Perry Alsbury Letter
  Santa Anna's Letter
 Santa Anna's Account of the Battle
 Account of the battle by Creed Taylor
 San Jacinto
 Vince's Bridge
 Deaf Smith’s biography at Texas Junction website
 

1787 births
1837 deaths
Army of the Republic of Texas officers
Deaf military personnel
People of the Texas Revolution
Members of the Texas Ranger Division
American deaf people
People from West Columbia, Texas